Comadia intrusa is a moth in the family Cossidae first described by William Barnes and Foster Hendrickson Benjamin in 1923. It is found in North America, where it has been recorded from New Mexico, Arizona and California.

The wingspan is 13–17 mm for males and about 20 mm for females. The forewings are white with light pale brown scattering. The hindwings are light fuscous. Adults have been recorded on wing from May to June.

References

Cossinae
Moths described in 1923
Moths of North America